Sazhino is a rural locality (a selo) in Dubovskoye Rural Settlement, Beryozovsky District, Perm Krai, Russia. The population was 130 as of 2010. There are 3 streets.

Geography 
Sazhino is located 15 km west of  Beryozovka (the district's administrative centre) by road. Metalnikovo is the nearest rural locality.

References 

Rural localities in Beryozovsky District, Perm Krai